Yuri Shefler ((born 10 September 1967) is a Russian, British and Israeli billionaire businessman. He is the owner of SPI Group, an international consortium that sells alcohol in 160 countries, most notably the Stolichnaya vodka brand. As of March 2022, his net worth was estimated at US$1.5 billion.

Business career 
Shefler left the Soviet Army in September 1987. In the early 1990s, as a student, he was engaged in vouchers and petty trade. Co-founded the Sadko-Arkada (Садко-Аркада) trading house , became a shareholder and headed Vnukovo Airlines, Nafta-Moscow (Нафта Москва), GUM and TSUM.

In 2015 he sold Serene to Saudi Crown Prince Mohammed bin Salman for a reported $550 million. In March 2017 he bought Tulchan Estate on Speyside, Scotland's most expensive sporting estate.

On 17 February 2022, Brad Pitt alleged that Angelina Jolie sold to Shefler's wine group Tenute del Mondo, which is a subsidiary of Shefler's Stoli Group, her interest in the Château Miraval at Correns in Provence, France, which Pitt and Jolie purchased in 2008 for $28.4 million.

SPI Group 
SPI Group produces and sells alcohol under 380 brands in 160 countries, most notably Stolichnaya vodka. SPI Group also owns Louisiana Spirits Company, Fabrica de Tequilas Finos in Mexico and Achaval Ferrer in Argentina.

Despite a more than 15 year dispute with Russian state-owned company FKP Sojuzplodoimport (FKP) regarding the ownership of the Stolichnaya and Moskovskaya trademarks, Shefler's SPI Group owns the trademarks in more than 180 countries. The only notable decision against SPI Group has been in the Netherlands, but that decision remains subject to appeal before the Dutch Supreme Court.

Personal life 
Shefler was born to a Russian Jewish family in Oryol. He has citizenship in the United Kingdom and Israel.

He is married to Tatiana Kovylina, a Russian model who once worked for Victoria's Secret. They have four children and live in Geneva, Switzerland. As reported by Forbes in March 2022, Shefler had an estimated net worth of $1.5 billion.

References 

1967 births
Living people
21st-century British businesspeople
Russian billionaires
People from Oryol
British business executives
21st-century Israeli businesspeople
Israeli business executives
British people of Russian-Jewish descent
Israeli people of Russian-Jewish descent
Russian businesspeople in the United Kingdom
Russian businesspeople in Israel